Touché Amoré / The Casket Lottery is a split EP between the American bands Touché Amoré and The Casket Lottery. The album was released on October 2, 2012 through No Sleep Records. Each of the bands contributed one new song and one cover song. This EP marks the first release of new material from The Casket Lottery since 2003.

Track listing
Touché Amoré
 "Whale Belly" – 1:58
 "Unsatisfied" (originally by The Replacements) – 3:11

The Casket Lottery
 "White Lies" – 3:04
 "Myth" (originally by Beach House) – 4:10

References

2012 EPs
Touché Amoré albums
No Sleep Records EPs